The 2003 Montreal Expos season was the 35th season for the Expos in Montreal and its penultimate season in Canada. It involved the Expos attempting to win the NL East. On August 28, 2003, the Expos led the NL Wild Card, tied for first place with the Marlins, Astros, Phillies, and Cardinals, but faded away in the stretch and failed to make the postseason, finishing 18 games back of the Atlanta Braves in the NL East and 8 games back of the Florida Marlins in the Wild Card. The Expos' 2003 record of 83-79 was identical to the one they finished with the previous year. Part of this was due to the fact that when rosters expanded on September 1, MLB refused to allow the league owned team to add any players, saying they could not afford the cost.

Spring training
After holding spring training at Roger Dean Stadium in Jupiter, Florida, from 1998 through 2002, the Expos moved to Space Coast Stadium in Viera, Florida, for spring training in 2003. The move to Viera came about as the result of a deal in which Major League Baseball bought the Expos from Jeffrey Loria, who then purchased the Florida Marlins; as part of the deal, the Marlins traded spring training sites with the Expos, moving from Viera to Jupiter. The franchise, as the Expos in 2003 and 2004 and then from 2005 as the Washington Nationals, would hold spring training at Space Coast Stadium through 2016.

Regular season
June 24, 2003 – Brad Wilkerson hit for the cycle in a game against the Pittsburgh Pirates.
June 28, 2003 - Texas Rangers outfielder Juan Gonzalez rejected a trade to the Expos, exercising the no-trade clause in his contract after the teams agreed to a deal.
August 26, 2003 – The Expos rallied from being down 8-0 and 10-3 to claim a 14-10 win against the Philadelphia Phillies and be within two games of the National League Wild Card. It was the second biggest comeback in Expos history.
September 14, 2003 – Vladimir Guerrero hits for the cycle against the New York Mets.

On August 30, 2002, MLB signed a collective bargaining agreement with
the players association, which prohibited contraction through the end of the agreement in 2006.

Ultimately, the Expos finished 8 games behind the Wild Card (and World Series Champion) Florida Marlins.

Puerto Rico
Although their attendance increased from 7,935 per game in 2001
to 10,031 in 2002,
MLB decided that the Expos would play 22 of their home games at Hiram Bithorn Stadium in San Juan, Puerto Rico in 2003.  Despite being a considerably smaller facility (it seats approximately 19,000) than Montreal's Olympic Stadium, attendance in San Juan's Hiram Bithorn Stadium averaged 14,222, compared with 12,081 in Montreal.
The Puerto Rican baseball fans embraced "Los Expos" (particularly Puerto Rican players José Vidro, Javier Vázquez and Wil Cordero, and other Latin players like Vladimir Guerrero and Liván Hernández) as their home team (as well as the Latin players from other teams), all the while hoping the team would make a permanent move to Puerto Rico. Thanks in part to the San Juan games, the Expos were able to draw over a million fans at home in 2003 for the first time since 1997. The Expos' season in Puerto Rico was chronicled in the MLB-produced DVD Boricua Beisbol – Passion of Puerto Rico.

Opening Day lineup 
Source

Season standings

National League East

Record vs. opponents

Notable transactions
August 20, 2003: The Expos signed Todd Zeile as a free agent.

Roster

Game log

|- align="center" bgcolor="bbffbb"
| 1 || March 31 || @ Braves || 10–2 || Armas (1–0) || Maddux (0–1) || || 40,258 || 1–0
|-

|- align="center" bgcolor="bbffbb"
| 2 || April 2 || @ Braves || 3–0 || Day (1–0) || Ramírez (0–1) || Biddle (1) || 19,116 || 2–0
|- align="center" bgcolor="bbffbb"
| 3 || April 3 ||@ Braves || 4–0 || Vázquez (1–0) || Ortiz (0–1) || || 19,505 || 3–0
|- align="center" bgcolor="ffbbbb"
| 4 || April 4 || @ Mets || 0–4 || Cone (1-0) || Ohka (0-1) || || 18,040 || 3–1
|- align="center" bgcolor="ffbbbb"
| 5 ||  April 5 || @ Mets || 1-3  || Glavine (1-1) || Armas (1–1) || Benítez (2) || 36,817 || 3–2
|- align="center" bgcolor="bbffbb"
| 6 ||  April 6 || @ Mets || 8–5 || Stewart (1-0) || Benítez (0-1) || Biddle (2) || 35,093 || 4–2
|- align="center" bgcolor="bbbbbb"
| – || April 7 || @ Cubs || colspan=6| Postponed (snow) Rescheduled for April 8
|- align="center" bgcolor="ffbbbb"
| 7 ||  April 8 || @ Cubs || 1–6 || Clement (1-1) || Day (1-1) || || 29,138 || 4–3
|- align="center" bgcolor="ffbbbb"
| 8 ||  April 9 || @ Cubs || 0–3 || Prior (2-0) || Vázquez (1–1) || || 29,966 || 4–4 
|- align="center" bgcolor="bbffbb"
| 9 ||  April 10 || @ Cubs || 7–1  || Armas (2–1) || Estes (0-1) || || 30,225 || 5–4
|- align="center" bgcolor="bbffbb"
| 10 || April 11 || vs. Mets@ San Juan, PR || 10–0 || Ohka (1-1)  || Cone (1-1) || || 17,906 || 6–4
|- align="center" bgcolor="bbffbb"
| 11 || April 12 || vs. Mets@ San Juan, PR || 5–4 || Hernández (1-0)  || Seo (0-1) || Biddle (3) || 18,264 || 7–4
|- align="center" bgcolor="bbffbb"
| 12 || April 13 || vs. Mets@ San Juan, PR || 2–1 (10) || Biddle (1-0)  || Stanton (0-2) || || 16,332 || 8–4
|- align="center" bgcolor="bbffbb"
| 13 || April 14 || vs. Mets@ San Juan, PR || 5–3 || Smith (1-0) || Strickland (0-1) || Biddle (4) || 13,155 || 9–4
|- align="center" bgcolor="ffbbbb"
| 14 || April 15 || vs. Braves@ San Juan, PR || 1–2 (10) || Bong (1-0) || Smith (1-1) || Smoltz (4) || 13,339 || 9–5
|- align="center" bgcolor="ffbbbb"
| 15 || April 16 || vs. Braves@ San Juan, PR || 2–3 || Ramírez (1-2) || Okha (1-2) || Smoltz (5) || 15,571 || 9–6
|- align="center" bgcolor="ffbbbb"
| 16 || April 17 || vs. Braves@ San Juan, PR || 8–14 (10) || Bong (2-0) || Biddle (1–1) || || 13,170 || 9–7
|- align="center" bgcolor="bbbbbb"
| – || April 18 || vs. Reds@ San Juan, PR || colspan=6| Postponed (rain) Rescheduled for April 19 as part of a doubleheader
|- align="center" bgcolor="bbffbb"
| 17 || April 19 (1) || vs. Reds@ San Juan, PR || 8–7 (10) || Ayala (1-0) || Williamson (2-1) || || 10,296 || 10–7
|- align="center" bgcolor="bbffbb"
| 18 || April 19 (2) || vs. Reds@ San Juan, PR || 9–5 || Vázquez (2-1) || Anderson (1-2) || || 13,109 || 11–7
|- align="center" bgcolor="ffbbbb"
| 19 || April 20 || vs. Reds@ San Juan, PR || 5–7 || Sullivan (1-0) || Ayala (1-2) || Williamson (3) || 11,619 || 11–8
|- align="center" bgcolor="bbffbb"
| 20 || April 22 || Diamondbacks || 4–0 || Ohka (2-2) || Good (1-1) || || 36,879 || 12–8
|- align="center" bgcolor="ffbbbb"
| 21 || April 23 || Diamondbacks || 2–6 || Dessens (2-2)  || Hernández (1-1) || || 6,380 || 12–9 
|- align="center" bgcolor="bbffbb"
| 22 || April 24 || Diamondbacks || 1–0 || Vázquez (3-1)  || Kim (1-4) || Biddle (5) || 5,954 || 13–9
|- align="center" bgcolor="bbffbb"
| 23 || April 25 || Astros || 10–2 || Day (2–1) || Robertson (1–3) || || 6,863 || 14–9
|- align="center" bgcolor="bbffbb"
| 24 || April 26 || Astros || 3–2 (10) || Biddle (2–1) || Wagner (1–1) || || 8,492 || 15–9
|- align="center" bgcolor="ffbbbb"
| 25 || April 27 ||Astros || 3–6 || Redding (2–2)  || Ohka (2–3) || Dotel (7) || 52,900 || 15–10
|- align="center" bgcolor="bbffbb"
| 26 || April 29 || @ Brewers || 3–2  || Stewart (2–0)  || DeJean (0–2) || Biddle (6) || 10,044 || 16–10
|- align="center" bgcolor="bbffbb"
| 27 || April 30 || @ Brewers || 10–4 || Hernández (2-1) || Sheets (2–3) || || 10,945 || 17–10
|-

|- align="center" bgcolor="bbffbb"
| 28 || May 1 || @ Brewers || 5–0 || Day (3-1) || Franklin (1-3) || || 13,180 || 18–10
|- align="center" bgcolor="ffbbbb"
| 29 || May 2 || @ Cardinals || 1–8 || Simontacchi (1–1) || Ohka (2–4) || || 41,810 || 18–11
|- align="center" bgcolor="ffbbbb"
| 30 || May 3 || @ Cardinals || 1–3 || Stephenson (2–2) || Vargas (0–1) ||Calero (1) || 36,176 || 18–12
|- align="center" bgcolor="ffbbbb"
| 31 || May 4 || @ Cardinals || 2–6 || Morris (3–2) || Vázquez (3-2) || || 39,605 || 18–13
|- align="center" bgcolor="bbffbb"
| 32 || May 6 || Padres || 4–2 || Hernández (3–1) || Peavy (4–3) || Biddle (7) || 5,841 || 19–13
|- align="center" bgcolor="bbffbb"
| 33 || May 7 || Padres || 12-9 (10) || Biddle (3-1) || Orosco (0-1) || || 5,111 || 20-13
|- align="center" bgcolor="bbffbb"
| 34 || May 8 || Padres || 12-5 || Ohka (3-4) || Lawrence (2-4) || || 5,274 || 21-13
|- align="center" bgcolor="ffbbbb"
| 35 || May 9 || Dodgers || 5-9 || Mota (2-1) || Stewart (2-1) || || 10,675 || 21-14
|- align="center" bgcolor="bbffbb" 
| 36 || May 10 || Dodgers || 6-5 || Ayala (2-1) || Martin (0-1) || Biddle (8) ||  8,084 || 22-14
|- align="center" bgcolor="ffbbbb"
| 37 || May 11 ||Dodgers || 4-3 || Pérez (2-2) || Hernández (3-2) || Gagné (12) || 14,488|| 22-15
|- align="center" bgcolor="bbffbb" 
| 38 || May 12 || @ Giants || 4-3 || Day (4-1) || Moss (5-1) || Biddle (9) || 33,071 || 23-15
|- align="center" bgcolor="bbffbb"
| 39 || May 13 || @ Giants || 6-4 || Smith (2-1) || Ainsworth (3-3) || Biddle (10) || 32,991 || 24-15
|- align="center" bgcolor="bbffbb"
| 40 || May 14 || @ Giants || 6-3 || Vargas (1-1) || Foppert (2-3) || || 38,963 || 25-15
|- align="center" bgcolor="ffbbbb"
| 41 || May 15 || @ Rockies  || 2-4 || Jones (2-0) || Tucker (0-1) || Jiménez (11) || 23,197 || 25-16
|- align="center" bgcolor="bbffbb"
| 42 || May 16 || @ Rockies || 4-1 || Ayala (3-1) || Cruz (3-4) || Biddle (11) || 27,117 || 26-16
|- align="center" bgcolor="bbffbb"
| 43 || May 17 || @ Rockies || 6-4 (10) ||  Ayala (4-1) || Jones (1-2) || || 30,052 || 27-16
|- align="center" bgcolor="ffbbbb"
| 44 || May 18 ||  @ Rockies || 0-4 || Chacón (5-2) || Ohka (3-5) || || 30,720 || 27-17
|- align="center" bgcolor="bbffbb"
| 45 || May 20 || Marlins || 6-4 || Vázquez (4–2) || Willis (1-1) || Biddle (13) || 5,435 || 28-17
|- align="center" bgcolor="bbffbb"
| 46 || May 21 || Marlins || 7-2 || Vargas (2-1) || Pavano (3-5) || || 5,282 || 29-17
|- align="center" bgcolor="bbffbb"
| 47 || May 22 || Marlins || 8–2 || Hernández (4–2) || Tejera (0-3) || || 6,249 || 30–17
|- align="center" bgcolor="ffbbbb"
| 48 || May 23 || Phillies || 2–4 || Millwood (7–1) || Day (4-2) || Mesa (13) || 9,511 || 30–18
|- align="center" bgcolor="bbffbb"
| 49 || May 24 || Phillies || 3–2 || Ayala (5–1) || Silva (3–1) || || 33,236 || 31–18
|- align="center" bgcolor="bbffbb"
| 50 || May 25 || Phillies || 5–3 || Vázquez (5–2) || Myers (4–4) || Biddle (14) ||  17,023 || 32–18
|- align="center" bgcolor="ffbbbb"
| 51 || May 26 || @ Marlins || 1–5 || Pavano (4–5) || Vargas (2–2) || || 8,362 || 32–19
|- align="center" bgcolor="bbbbbb"
| – || May 27 || @ Marlins || colspan=6| Postponed (rain) Rescheduled for May 28 as part of a doubleheader
|- align="center" bgcolor="ffbbbb"
| 52 || May 28 (1) || @ Marlins || 3–4 || Phelps (2–0) || Hernández (4–3) || Looper (8) ||  || 32–20 
|- align="center" bgcolor="ffbbbb"
| 53 || May 28 (2) || @ Marlins || 0–6 || Tejera (1–3) || Day (4–3) || || 9,169 || 32–21
|- align="center" bgcolor="bbffbb"
| 54 || May 29 || @ Marlins || 3–2 || Ohka (4–5) || Almanza (3–3) || Biddle (15) || 9,052 || 33–21
|- align="center" bgcolor="ffbbbb"
| 55 || May 30 || @ Phillies || 5–12 || Cormier (2–0) || Vázquez (5–3) || || 18,311 || 33–22
|- align="center" bgcolor="bbbbbb"
| – || May 31 || @ Phillies || colspan=6| Postponed (rain) Rescheduled for June 1 as part of a doubleheader
|-

|- align="center" bgcolor="ffbbbb"
| 56 || June 1 (1) || @ Phillies || 3–4 || Wolf (6–3) || Hernández  (4–4) || Mesa (14) ||  || 33–23
|- align="center" bgcolor="ffbbbb"
| 57 || June 1 (2) || @ Phillies || 1–4  || Myers (5–4) || Smith (2–2) || Mesa (15) || 36,685 || 33–24
|- align="center" bgcolor="ffbbbb"
| 58 || June 3 || vs. Angels@ San Juan, PR || 4–15 || Ortiz (5–5) || Ohka (4–6) || || 10,034 || 33–25
|- align="center" bgcolor="ffbbbb"
| 59 || June 4 || vs. Angels@ San Juan, PR || 2–11 || Washburn (6–5) || Kim (0–1) || || 10,501 || 33–26
|- align="center" bgcolor="bbffbb"
| 60 || June 5 || vs. Angels@ San Juan, PR || 8–7 (14) || Eischen (5–2) || Callaway (1–4) || || 10,598 || 34–26
|- align="center" bgcolor="bbffbb"
| 61 || June 6 || vs. Rangers@ San Juan, PR || 13–10 || Hernández (5–4) || Lewis (4–4) || || 18,005 || 35–26
|- align="center" bgcolor="bbffbb"
| 62 || June 7 || vs. Rangers@ San Juan, PR || 5–4 || Vargas (3–2) || Shouse (0–1) || Ayala (1) || 18,003 || 36–26
|- align="center" bgcolor="bbffbb"
| 63 || June 8 || vs. Rangers@ San Juan, PR|| 3–2 || Stewart (3–1) || Cordero (2–6) || Biddle (16) || 18,001 || 37–26
|- align="center" bgcolor="bbffbb"
| 64 || June 10 || @ Mariners || 7–3 || Vázquez (6–3) || Meche (8–3) || Ayala (2) || 34,811 || 38–26
|- align="center" bgcolor="bbffbb"
| 65 || June 11 || @ Mariners || 3–1 || Hernández (6–4) || Piñeiro (5–5) || Biddle (17) || 32,853 || 39–26
|- align="center" bgcolor="ffbbbb"
| 66 || June 12 || @ Mariners || 0–1 || Franklin (5–4) || Vargas (3–3) || Rhodes (1) || 33,761 || 39–27
|- align="center" bgcolor="ffbbbb"
| 67 || June 13 || @ Athletics || 4–8 || Mulder (9–4) || Ohka (4–7) || || 14,186 || 39–28
|- align="center" bgcolor="ffbbbb"
| 68 || June 14 || @ Athletics || 4–5 || Rincón (3–3) || Ayala (5–2) || Foulke (16) || 26,447 || 39–29
|- align="center" bgcolor="ffbbbb"
| 69 || June 15 || @ Athletics || 1–9 || Hudson (5–2) || Vázquez (6–4) || || 31,024 || 39–30
|- align="center" bgcolor="bbbbbb"
| – || June 17 || @ Pirates || colspan=6| Postponed (rain) Rescheduled for June 18 as part of a doubleheader
|- align="center" bgcolor="ffbbbb"
| 70 || June 18 (1) || @ Pirates || 3–7 || D'Amico (5–7) || Hernández (6–5) || Williams (19)||  || 39–31
|- align="center" bgcolor="ffbbbb"
| 71 || June 18 (2) || @ Pirates || 3–4 || Torres (4–1) || Biddle (3–2) || || 22,557 || 39–32
|- align="center" bgcolor="bbffbb"
| 72 || June 19 || @ Pirates || 5–2 || Ohka (5–7) || Torres (4–2) || || 16,050 || 40–32
|- align="center" bgcolor="ffbbbb"
| 73 || June 20 || Blue Jays || 4–8 || Lidle (10–4) || Vázquez  (6–5) || || 11,355 || 40–33
|- align="center" bgcolor="bbffbb"
| 74 || June 21 || Blue Jays || 8–5 || Ayala (6–2) || Politte (1–5) || Biddle (19) || 11,483 || 41–33
|- align="center" bgcolor="ffbbbb"
| 75 || June 22 || Blue Jays || 2–4 || Halladay (11–2) || Hernández (6–6) || Politte (11) || 15,508 || 41–34
|- align="center" bgcolor="bbffbb"
| 76 || June 23 || Pirates || 3–0 || Vargas (4–3) || Suppan (5–7) || Biddle (20) || 5,641 || 42–34
|- align="center" bgcolor="bbffbb"
| 77 || June 24 || Pirates || 6–4 || Ohka (6–7) || D'Amico (5–8) || Biddle (21) || 5,872 || 43–34
|- align="center" bgcolor="ffbbbb"
| 78 || June 25 || Pirates || 5–6  || Sauerbeck (3–4) || Eischen (1–1) || Williams (20) || 5,717 || 43-35
|- align="center" bgcolor="ffbbbb"
| 79 || June 27 || @ Blue Jays || 5–6 || Miller (1–1) || Mañón (0–1) || || 24,024 || 43-36
|- align="center" bgcolor="bbffbb"
| 80 || June 28 || @ Blue Jays || 4–2 || Vargas (5–3) || Davis (4–5) || Biddle (22) || 33,334 || 44-36
|- align="center" bgcolor="bbffbb"
| 81 || June 29 || @ Blue Jays || 10–2 || Ohka (7–7) || Escobar (5–5) || || 37,354 || 45-36
|- align="center" bgcolor="ffbbbb"
| 82 || June 30 || @ Mets || 1–3 || Trachsel (7–5) || Vázquez  (6–6) || Benítez (19) || 29,829 || 45-37
|-

|- align="center" bgcolor="ffbbbb"
| 83 || July 1 || @ Mets || 6–7 || Benítez (2–3) || Mañón (0–2) || || 30,084 || 45-38
|- align="center" bgcolor="bbffbb"
| 84 || July 2 || @ Mets  || 11–4 || Hernández (7–6) || Seo (5–4) || || 35,547 || 46-38
|- align="center" bgcolor="bbffbb"
| 85 || July 3 || @ Braves || 5–4 || Vargas (6–3) || Reynolds (5–4) || Mañón (1) || 31,607 || 47-38
|- align="center" bgcolor="ffbbbb"
| 86 || July 4 || @ Braves || 6–8 || Ortiz (11–4) || Ohka (7–8) || Smoltz (31) || 48,923 || 47-39
|- align="center" bgcolor="ffbbbb"
| 87 || July 5 ||  @ Braves || 2–3 || Bong (1–3) || Biddle (3–3) || || 34,454 || 47-40
|- align="center" bgcolor="ffbbbb"
| 88 || July 6 || @ Braves || 5–7 || Hampton (4–5) || Drew (0–1) || Smoltz (32) || 27,724 || 47-41
|- align="center" bgcolor="bbffbb"
| 89 || July 7 || Phillies || 8–1 || Hernández (8–6) || Duckworth (3–3) || || 7,099 || 48-41
|- align="center" bgcolor="ffbbbb"
| 90 || July 8 || Phillies || 6–13 || Myers (9–6) || Vargas (6–4) || || 8,225 || 48-42
|- align="center" bgcolor="ffbbbb"
| 91 || July 9 || Phillies || 0–2 || Millwood (10–6) || Ohka (7–9) || || 7,005 || 48-43
|- align="center" bgcolor="ffbbbb"
| 92 || July 11 || Marlins || 4–5 || Penny (8–6) || Biddle (3–4) || Looper (17) || 7,251 || 48-44
|- align="center" bgcolor="bbffbb"
| 93 || July 12 || Marlins || 7–1 || Hernández (9–6) || Redman (7–4) || || 28,170 || 49-44
|- align="center" bgcolor="ffbbbb"
| 94 || July 13 || Marlins || 4–11 || Willis (9–1) || Vargas (6–5) || || 16,084 || 49-45
|- style="text-align:center; background:#bbb;"
|colspan=9| All–Star Break (July 14–16)
|- align="center" bgcolor="ffbbbb"
| 95 || July 17 || @ Phillies || 2–5 (11) || Plesac (2–0) || Drew (0–2) || || 23,874 || 49-46
|- align="center" bgcolor="bbffbb"
| 96 || July 18 || @ Phillies || 3–1 || Vázquez (7–6) || Wolf (10–5) || || 22,789 || 50-46
|- align="center" bgcolor="ffbbbb"
| 97 || July 19 || @ Phillies || 3–4 (11) || Mesa (5–5) || Almonte (0–2) || || 28,794 || 50-47
|- align="center" bgcolor="ffbbbb"
| 98 || July 20 || @ Phillies || 2–3 || Myers (10–6) || Vargas (6–6) || Mesa (19) || 37,552 || 50-48
|- align="center" bgcolor="ffbbbb"
| 99 || July 21 || @ Marlins || 1–4 || Beckett (4–4) || Knott (0–1) || || 10,769 || 50-49
|- align="center" bgcolor="ffbbbb"
| 100 || July 22 || @ Marlins || 1–9 || Pavano (7–10) || Ohka (7–10) || || 10,512 || 50-50
|- align="center" bgcolor="bbffbb"
| 101 || July 23 || Mets || 5–2 || Vázquez (8–6) || Seo (5–7) || Biddle (23) || 8,853 || 51-50
|- align="center" bgcolor="bbffbb"
| 102 || July 24 || Mets || 5–1 || Hernández (10–6) || Glavine (6–11) || Biddle (24) || 9,337 || 52-50
|- align="center" bgcolor="bbffbb"
| 103 || July 25 || Braves || 9–8 (11) || Ayala (7–2) || Bong (6–2) || || 10,069 || 53-50
|- align="center" bgcolor="ffbbbb"
| 104 || July 26 || Braves || 4–15 || Reynolds (8–5) || Day (4–4) || || 14,132 || 53-51
|- align="center" bgcolor="bbffbb"
| 105 || July 27 || Braves || 13–10 || Mañón (1–2) || King (3–1) || Biddle (25) || 16,074 || 54-51
|- align="center" bgcolor="ffbbbb"
| 106 || July 28 || Braves || 8–10 || Hampton (7–5) ||  Vázquez (8–7) || Smoltz (38) || 9,750 || 54-52
|- align="center" bgcolor="ffbbbb"
| 107 || July 29 || Cardinals || 1–2 || Stephenson (5–10) ||  Hernández (10–7) || || 7,418 || 54-53
|- align="center" bgcolor="ffbbbb"
| 108 || July 30 || Cardinals || 1–11 || Haren (2–2) || Vargas (6–7) || || 6,129 || 54-54
|- align="center" bgcolor="bbffbb"
| 109 || July 31 || Cardinals || 3–2 || Day (5–4) || Williams (14–4) || Biddle (26) || 9,145 || 55-54
|-

|- align="center" bgcolor="bbffbb"
| 110 || August 1 || Brewers || 8–4 || Ohka (8–10) || Franklin (7–8) || || 6,518 || 56-54
|- align="center" bgcolor="bbffbb"
| 111 || August 2 || Brewers || 7–1 || Vázquez (9–7) || Manning (0–1) || || 22,180 || 57-54
|- align="center" bgcolor="bbffbb"
| 112 || August 3 || Brewers || 4–2 || Hernández (11–7) || Sheets (10–8) || Biddle (27) || 17,953 || 58-54
|- align="center" bgcolor="ffbbbb"
| 113 || August 5 || @ Diamondbacks || 5–8 || Johnson (2–4) || Vargas (6–8) || Mantei (13) || 37,959 || 58-55
|- align="center" bgcolor="ffbbbb"
| 114 || August 6 || @ Diamondbacks || 2–3 || Oropesa (3–2) || Ayala (7–3) || Mantei (14) || 28,328 || 58-56
|- align="center" bgcolor="ffbbbb"
| 115 || August 7 || @ Diamondbacks || 4–5 (10) || Valverde (2–0) || Knott (0–2) || || 28,852|| 58-57
|- align="center" bgcolor="ffbbbb"
| 116 || August 8 || @ Astros || 1–5 || Miceli (5–6) || Vázquez (9–8) || || 30,037 || 58-58
|- align="center" bgcolor="bbffbb"
| 117 || August 9 || @ Astros || 3–1 || Hernández (12–7) || Fernández (1–1) || || 35,295 || 59-58
|- align="center" bgcolor="ffbbbb"
| 118 || August 10 || @ Astros || 2–8 || Villone (4–2) || Downs (0–1) || || 32,340 || 59-59
|- align="center" bgcolor="bbffbb"
| 119 || August 11 || Rockies || 3–1 || Day (6–4) || Jennings (10–10) || Biddle (28) || 6,401 || 60-59
|- align="center" bgcolor="ffbbbb"
| 120 || August 12 || Rockies || 3–6 (11)|| Fuentes (3–1) ||  Biddle (3–5) || López (1) || 7,277 || 60-60
|- align="center" bgcolor="bbffbb"
| 121 || August 13 || Rockies || 6–5 || Vázquez (10–8) || Stark (1–1) || Ayala (3) || 6,724 || 61-60
|- align="center" bgcolor="bbffbb"
| 122 || August 15 || Giants || 4–1 || Hernández (13–7) || Foppert (8–9) || || 10,551 || 62-60
|- align="center" bgcolor="bbffbb"
| 123 || August 16 || Giants || 4–1 || Day (7–4) || Schmidt (12–5) || Biddle (29) || 16,446 || 63-60
|- align="center" bgcolor="bbffbb"
| 124 || August 17 || Giants || 4–2 || Biddle (4–5) || Ponson (14–9) || || 17,665 || 64-60
|- align="center" bgcolor="bbffbb"
| 125 || August 18 || Giants || 4–0 || Vázquez (11–8) || Hermanson (2–3) || || 9,224 || 65-60
|- align="center" bgcolor="bbffbb"
| 126 || August 19 || @ Dodgers || 7–5 || Ayala (8–3) || Quantrill (1–4) || Biddle (30) || 30,107 || 66-60
|- align="center" bgcolor="ffbbbb"
| 127 || August 20 || @ Dodgers || 1–4 (10) || Gagné (2–3) || Biddle (4–6) || || 31,427 || 66-61
|- align="center" bgcolor="ffbbbb"
| 128 || August 21 || @ Dodgers || 1–2 || Pérez (10–9) || Day (7–5) || Gagné (42)|| 33,319 || 66-62
|- align="center" bgcolor="ffbbbb"
| 129 || August 22 || @ Padres || 3–5 || Linebrink (3–2) || Eischen (1–2) || Beck (18) || 17,590 || 66-63
|- align="center" bgcolor="ffbbbb"
| 130 || August 23 || @ Padres || 0–1 (10) || Matthews (4–4) || Biddle (4–7) || || 29,450 || 66-64
|- align="center" bgcolor="bbffbb"
| 131 || August 24 || @ Padres || 8–4 || Knott (1–2) || Jarvis (4–6) || || 24,707 || 67-64
|- align="center" bgcolor="bbffbb"
| 132 || August 25 || Phillies || 12–1 || Hernández (14–7) || Wolf (12–9) || || 30,501 || 68-64
|- align="center" bgcolor="bbffbb"
| 133 || August 26 || Phillies || 14–10 || Eischen (2–2) || Williams (1–6) || Ayala (4) || 12,509 || 69-64
|- align="center" bgcolor="bbffbb"
| 134 || August 27 || Phillies || 9–6 || Almonte (1–2) || Plesac (2–1) || Biddle (31) || 20,105 || 70-64
|- align="center" bgcolor="bbffbb"
| 135 || August 28 || Phillies || 4–0 || Vázquez (12–8) || Telemaco (1–2) || || 20,030 || 71-64
|- align="center" bgcolor="ffbbbb"
| 136 || August 29 || @ Marlins || 2–3 || Looper (5–3) || Biddle (4–8) || || 12,231 || 71-65
|- align="center" bgcolor="ffbbbb"
| 137 || August 30  || @ Marlins || 3–4 || Pavano (11–11) || Hernández (14–8) || Looper (25) || 20,724 || 71-66
|- align="center" bgcolor="ffbbbb"
| 138 || August 31 || @ Marlins || 3–5 || Redman (11–8) || Day (7–6) || Urbina (27) || 11,105 || 71-67
|-

|- align="center" bgcolor="ffbbbb"
| 139 || September 1 || @ Marlins || 2–5 || Penny (12–10) || Ohka (8–11) || Looper (26) || 12,413 || 71-68
|- align="center" bgcolor="ffbbbb"
| 140 || September 2 || @ Phillies || 3–5 || Cormier (5–0) || Vázquez (12–9) || Plesac (2) || 26,719 || 71-69
|- align="center" bgcolor="ffbbbb"
| 141 || September 3 || @ Phillies || 3–8 || Millwood (14–9) || Tucker (0–2) || || 18,002 || 71-70
|- align="center" bgcolor="bbffbb"
| 142 || September 5 || vs. Marlins@ San Juan, PR || 6–2 || Hernández (15–8) || Redman (11–9) || || 11,509 || 72-70
|- align="center" bgcolor="ffbbbb"
| 143 || September 6 || vs. Marlins@ San Juan, PR || 4–14 || Penny (13–10) || Ohka (8–12) || || 14,570 || 72-71
|- align="center" bgcolor="ffbbbb"
| 144 || September 7 || vs. Marlins@ San Juan, PR || 1–3 || Willis (12–6) || Vázquez (12–10) || Looper (27) || 12,647 || 72-72
|- align="center" bgcolor="ffbbbb"
| 145 || September 9 || vs. Cubs@ San Juan, PR || 3–4 ||  Zambrano (13–9) || Day (7–7) || Borowski (26) || 15,632 || 72-73
|- align="center" bgcolor="bbffbb"
| 146 || September 10 || vs. Cubs@ San Juan, PR || 8–4 || Ayala (9–3) || Farnsworth (3–2) || || 18,002 || 73-73
|- align="center" bgcolor="bbffbb"
| 147 || September 11 || vs. Cubs@ San Juan, PR || 3–2 || Ohka (9–12) || Prior (15–6) || Eischen (1) || 12,559 || 74-73
|- align="center" bgcolor="bbffbb"
| 148 || September 12 || Mets || 7–4 || Tucker (1–2) || Leiter (14–8) || Ayala (5) || 10,701 || 75-73
|- align="center" bgcolor="ffbbbb"
| 149 || September 13 || Mets || 4–5 || Trachsel (15–9) || Vázquez (12–11) || Roberts (1) || 15,086 || 75-74
|- align="center" bgcolor="bbffbb"
| 150 || September 14 || Mets || 7–3 || Day (8–7) || Glavine (9–13) || || 21,417 || 76-74
|- align="center" bgcolor="ffbbbb"
| 151 || September 15 || Braves || 6–10 || Ramírez (11–4) || Hernández (15–9) || || 9,696 || 76-75
|- align="center" bgcolor="bbffbb"
| 152 || September 16 || Braves || 5–4 (10) || Biddle (5–8) || Hernández (5–3) || || 9,843|| 77-75
|- align="center" bgcolor="ffbbbb"
| 153 || September 17 ||Braves || 4–14 || Hampton (14–7) || Tucker (1–3) || || 17,526 || 77-76
|- align="center" bgcolor="bbffbb"
| 154 || September 18 || @ Mets || 1–0 || Vázquez (13–11) || Trachsel (15–10) || Cordero (1) || 18,914 || 78-76
|- align="center" bgcolor="bbffbb"
| 155 || September 19 || @ Mets || 7–1 || Day (9–7) || Glavine (9–14) || || 33,083 || 79-76
|- align="center" bgcolor="bbffbb"
| 156 || September 20 ||  @ Mets || 4–3 (10) || Cordero (1–0) || Stanton (2–7) || Biddle (32) || 37,294 || 80-76
|- align="center" bgcolor="bbffbb"
| 157 || September 21 || @ Mets || 4–2 || Ayala (10–3) || Roberts (0–2) || Biddle (33) || 28,702 || 81-76
|- align="center" bgcolor="ffbbbb"
| 158 || September 23 || @ Braves || 0–2 || Wright (2–5) || Vázquez (13–12) || Smoltz (45) || 22,539 || 81-77
|- align="center" bgcolor="ffbbbb"
| 159 || September 24 || @ Braves || 1–9 || Ortiz (21–7) || Day (9–8) || || 23,594 || 81-78
|- align="center" bgcolor="bbffbb"
| 160 || September 26 || @ Reds || 5–1 || Ohka (10–12) || Harang (5–6) || || 28,870 || 82-78
|- align="center" bgcolor="ffbbbb"
| 161 || September 27 || @ Reds || 2–4 || Reith (2–3) || Hernández (15–10) || || 31,199 || 82-79
|- align="center" bgcolor="bbffbb"
| 162 || September 28 || @ Reds || 2–1 || Tucker (2–3) || Randall (2–5) || Biddle (34) || 32,322 || 83-79
|-

Attendance

Including both games played in Montreal and "home" games played in San Juan, the Expos drew 1,025,639 fans during the 2003 season, and were 16th in attendance among the 16 National League teams. Their highest attendance for the season was a game in Montreal on April 22, which attracted 36,879 fans to see them play the Arizona Diamondbacks, while their lowest was for a game in Montreal on May 7 against the San Diego Padres, which drew only 5,111 fans. For games played in San Juan, the largest crowd was 18,264 for a game against the New York Mets on April 12, and the smallest was a crowd of 10,034 that came to a game against the Anaheim Angels on June 3.

Player stats

Batting 
Note: Pos = Position; G = Games played; AB = At bats; R = Runs scored; H = Hits; 2B = Doubles; 3B = Triples; HR = Home runs; RBI = Runs batted in; AVG = Batting average; SB = Stolen bases

Complete offensive statistics are available here.

Pitching
Note: Pos = Position; W = Wins; L = Losses; ERA = Earned run average; G = Games pitched; GS = Games started; SV = Saves; IP = Innings pitched; R = Runs allowed; ER = Earned runs allowed; BB = Walks allowed; K = Strikeouts

Complete pitching statistics are available here.

Award winners
 Liván Hernández, National League Pitcher of the Month, July
2003 Major League Baseball All-Star Game

Farm system

Notes

References

External links
 2003 Montreal Expos at Baseball Reference
 2003 Montreal Expos at Baseball Almanac

Montreal Expos season
Montreal Expos seasons
2000s in Montreal
2003 in Quebec